is a concert hall in Okayama, Okayama, Japan. It opened in 1991 and seats 2,001. Yoshinobu Ashihara was the architect, with acoustical design by Nagata Acoustics.

See also
 Shoebox style (architecture)

References

External links

  

Okayama
Buildings and structures in Okayama Prefecture
Concert halls in Japan
Music venues completed in 1991
1991 establishments in Japan